

J.A.K.E. 1

J.A.K.E. 2

J'onn J'onzz

Jack

Jack of Clubs

Jack of Fire

Jack O'Lantern

Jack the Ripper

Jackal

Jackhammer

Jaclyn

Jade

Jacob Ashe

Jakeem Thunder

Aubrey James
Aubrey James is a fictional character appearing in American comic books published by DC Comics.

Aubrey James was the mayor of Gotham City and a friend of Thomas Wayne. He was later stabbed to death as mentioned in The Madmen of Gotham.

Aubrey James in other media
Aubrey James appeared in a recurring role on the TV series Gotham, portrayed by Richard Kind.

Java
Java is a fictional character appearing in American comic books published by DC Comics.

Java is the Neanderthal servant of Simon Stagg. He was first discovered by fortune hunter Rex Mason and revived by the scientific wizardry of Stagg Enterprises. Java was present the day that Mason discovered the Orb of Ra inside the pyramid of Ahk-Ton in Egypt. The Orb was responsible for transforming Rex Mason into the metamorphae known as Metamorpho the Element Man after Java knocked out Rex Mason in the presence of it.

For years, Java lusted after Simon's daughter Sapphire Stagg, but was unable to win her heart because she was in love with Metamorpho. This bred a bitter rivalry between the two; one that persisted for many years. Java even risked his life once to save Sapphire from a melting skyscraper, and was transformed into a petrified fossil for his actions. Stagg's scientific prowess saved his life and returned him to normal.

During a time when Metamorpho was believed to be dead, Sapphire relented to Java's persistent advances and married him. Java became the father figure to Sapphire and Rex's mutant son, Joey. Java was not an inherently evil individual, but his moral base had been compromised due to his constant exposure to the unscrupulous Simon Stagg. He was also extremely selfish when it came to his wants and desires. When Rex abducted Joey from Stagg Mansion, Java flew into a rage and was determined to kill him. Even Simon's command over him could not quell Java's emotions. Frustrated by the Neanderthal's rare act of defiance, Simon Stagg shot him in the head, seemingly killing him.

Java did not remain dead for long however. The means behind his resurrection are unknown, but he was seen once again several years later attending the funeral of Metamorpho (who at the time was believed to be dead).

During the "Brightest Day" storyline, Java was with Simon Stagg at his Canadian estate at the time when Metamorpho persuaded him to help him and the Outsiders get back into the United States. Later that night, Java pays Metamorpho a visit while he was sleeping. For some reason, Java still had the Orb of Ra in his possession. Java uses the orb to knock Metamorpho around until Metamorpho becomes unconscious. Java then takes Metamorpho's body down to Simon Stagg's lab where he plans to merge him with Chemo. It doesn't go well as Java calls in Simon Stagg's servant Freight Train to help stop it. Freight Train manages to use an electrical wire which causes Chemo to vomit out Metamorpho. Simon Stagg later did an unidentified experiment that enabled Java to transform into a Shaggy Man which was defeated by Freight Train.

In 2011, "The New 52" rebooted the DC universe. Java's history with Simon Stagg and Rex Mason remains the same.

Java was present when Simon Stagg had opened a portal to the Dark Multiverse and is trying to close it with Metamorpho who was transmuted to Nth Metal. He is present when Mister Terrific, Plastic Man, Metamorpho, and Phantom Girl return from the Dark Multiverse.

Java was revealed to have been operating as the villain Doctor Dread and has formed a counterpart of the Terrifics called the Dreadfuls. They were defeated by the Terrifics.

Java in other media
Java appears in the Justice League episode "Metamorphosis", voiced by Richard Moll. Like the comics, Java serves as Stagg's assistant. After an unsuccessful presentation of his new "Metamorpho" project, Stagg ordered Java to transport valuable mutagen samples by train. He was told not to let the briefcase out of his sight, but one of the attendants checked it into the luggage compartment, citing regulations. One of the vials broke, damaging the carriage and causing it to derail until the train was stopped by Green Lantern. Stagg reprimanded Java for this failure, as it drew unwarranted attention to his operations. True enough, Stagg hadn't finished when Rex Mason inquired about Java's presence on the train. This and the fact that Mason was seeing Stagg's daughter Sapphire led him to test out the Metamorpho project on Mason. The morning after, Java accompanied Stagg to Mason's hospital room. After learning what had happened, Rex went mad, but Java could not stop him and was knocked out with a bed pan. Following Mason's trail, Stagg was eager to get pictures of everything, using them to pit Mason against his old friend John Stewart. After reviewing the success of his designs in battle, he sat back to consider the military applications, but Mason caught on to him and easily dispatched Java. Down but not out, Java reached for a canister of liquid nitrogen and froze him. Java oversaw Stagg's attempts to refine the Metamorpho mutagen when Metamorpho barged into the lab. This time, Mason went straight for the nitrogen, knocking Java into a cabinet. In Mason's fight with Stagg, a giant synthetic creature was released, which destroyed half the laboratory. Java was able to get out before Green Lantern and Batman investigated the place.
Java appears in The Flash episode "Fastest Man Alive", portrayed by Michasha Armstrong. This version is an African-American and head of security for Stagg Enterprises. Danton Black paid him off so that he can attack Simon Stagg at a university gathering that was honoring him. Later on, Danton Black tried to get Java to grant him access to Simon Stagg's house. Java refused and punched Danton when he threatened him. In retaliation, Danton multiplies and beats Java to death.

Javelin

The Javelin is a fictional DC Comics supervillain.

The Javelin is a former German Olympic athlete who turned to a life of crime, using his uncanny abilities with a javelin-based weapons arsenal. The Javelin fought Green Lantern and was defeated before agreeing to serve with the Suicide Squad in exchange for the purging of his criminal record. His last Squad mission was a battle with Circe as part of the War of the Gods crossover event. It takes place in issue #58.

In the pages of Checkmate, the Javelin is recruited by the Mirror Master in an attempt to frame Amanda Waller. He teams up with several other villains, such as Plastique and the duo Punch and Jewelee. They invade a Myanmar military facility to neutralize what seems to be a superhuman power source. The Javelin is killed by a runaway jeep while trying to protect a distraught, newly widowed Jewelee.

Javelin in other media
 The Javelin makes non-speaking cameo appearances in Justice League Unlimited as a minor member of Gorilla Grodd's Secret Society.
 The Javelin makes a non-speaking cameo appearance in the Batman: The Brave and the Bold episode "Scorn of the Star Sapphire!".
 A character loosely inspired by the Javelin named Malcolm Byrd appears in the Arrow episode "The Demon", portrayed by Yanik Ethier. This version is a French arms dealer associated with the Ninth Circle.
 Gunter Braun / Javelin appears in The Suicide Squad, portrayed by Flula Borg. He is recruited into the eponymous group to destroy a Corto Maltese prison called Jötunheim, but is shot and mortally wounded during a skirmish with the local military. As he dies, he bequeaths his javelin, for an unknown reason, to teammate Harley Quinn, who later uses it to kill several Corto Maltesean soldiers and Starro.

Jefferson Jackson

Jefferson Jackson is a supporting character of Ronnie Raymond (a.k.a. Firestorm) who makes his debut in Firestorm (vol. 2) #1 (June 1982). Jackson is a former student of Bradley High School in Manhattan, New York. During his tenure at Bradley High, Jackson became a member of the school's championship basketball team, where he met Ronnie. The two became close friends, and Jackson frequently aided Ronnie during the numerous episodes wherein the latter would find himself embroiled in conflicts with school jerk Cliff Carmichael. Jackson dated a young woman named Stella, and the two frequently double-dated with Ronnie and his girlfriend, Doreen Day.

Jefferson Jackson in other media
Jefferson "Jax" Jackson appears in media set in the Arrowverse, portrayed by Franz Drameh.
 First appearing in the live-action TV series The Flash episode "The Fury of Firestorm", this version was a high school football player who was injured when S.T.A.R. Labs' particle accelerator exploded and was forced to become a mechanic instead. Following Ronnie Raymond's death and due to Martin Stein's F.I.R.E.S.T.O.R.M. matrix destabilizing, the Flash and his allies find and recruit Jax to save Stein and become the new Firestorm as all three were affected by the particle accelerator in a similar manner. Despite initial hesitancy, Jax joins forces with Stein and together they leave Central City to hone their powers.
 Jax appears in the animated web series Vixen.
 Jax appears in the live-action TV series Legends of Tomorrow. In season one, he and Stein are recruited by Rip Hunter to join his Legends to defeat Vandal Savage. Despite Jax refusing and Stein bringing him against his will, the former grows to appreciate being part of a team. In seasons two and three, Stein inadvertently changes the timeline and gives himself a daughter, who goes on to have a son named Ronnie. In light of this, Jax asks his teammate Ray Palmer for help in developing a formula to separate the F.I.R.E.S.T.O.R.M. matrix so the former can use Firestorm's power on his own and allow Stein to be with his family. During the "Crisis on Earth-X" crossover however, Stein is fatally injured while helping the Legends and Earth-1's heroes combat Nazis from Earth-X, but drinks Palmer's formula to save Jax from suffering his fate, sacrificing himself in the process. A distraught Jax leaves the Legends to heal from his grief, though a future version appears in the season three finale to help them defeat Mallus.

Jinny Hex

Virginia "Jinny" Hex is a fictional DC Comics superheroine. She is the granddaughter of Jonah Hex and a member of Young Justice. She first appeared in Batman Giant #4 (December 2018).

Jinx

Johnny Thunder

Joker

M'yrnn J'onzz
M'yrnn J'onzz is the father of the twin brothers J'onn J'onzz/Martian Manhunter and Ma'alefa'ak. His first appearance was in Martian Manhunter (vol. 2) #3 (August 2001).

M'yrnn J'onzz in other media
M'yrnn J'onzz is a recurring character in The CW's Supergirl, portrayed by Carl Lumbly. First appearing in season three episode, "Far From the Tree", J'onn's father M'yrnn was revealed to be alive and captured by the White Martians for centuries. He is coerced by them to reveal the location of Staff of Kolar, the psychic weapon believed to be a key to end a war. M'gann M'orzz, with her benevolent resistance army of White Martians, contacts J'onn J'onzz about his imprisonment. He, Supergirl and M'gann release him. J'onn takes him and the Staff on Earth so that he could be safe from them. Over the course of the season, M'rynn adjusts to the new life in National City, but is revealed to have a form of dementia, in which he slowly forgets his family and at one point causing a telepathic breakdown in DEO. M'rynn also makes a telepathic ritual with his son to show him a memories and a history of their kind so that J'onn could inherit from him. When Reign begins terraforming Earth, J'onn and M'rynn go to the point of earthquake. M'rynn shows him the last memory fragment before he merges with the Earth to stop the terraforming. During the fourth season, J'onn quits the D.E.O to try and follow in his father's footsteps by helping other aliens and to establish the peace on Earth in non-violent way. His activities however are put in temptation during an anti-alien hate propaganda and because he killed a former comrade-turned-enemy Manchester Black who sought to solve the problems in violent way. During the events of "All About Eve", J'onn establishes a memory link of his father to seek his advice. Admitting everything to his father what he did, M'yrnn tells him that J'onn cannot be entirely like him, but that his son can find own way to establish the peace and fight for it. J'onn takes the Staff of H'ronmeer to lay it on Mars. At the end of "American Dreamer", once at the desert of T'ozz, J'onn activates the staff and M'rynn appears as a spirit based in the sand, telling him to go home and join his family. He also appears in the flashback of the Season 5 episode "Blurred Lines", during a dream therapy session between Nia Nal and J'onn J'onzz, where he tries to help J'onn's brother Malefic J'onzz due to his instability of his powers in the mind and locks him in isolation. When Malefic J'onzz joins to the White Martians, he is devastated and blames himself. Not wanting to grow in pain, J'onn J'onzz erases him from both their memories. In "Tremors", J'onn seeks through his mind father's advice how to deal with his brother and his actions.

Rhea Jones
Rhea Jones is a fictional character appearing in American comic books published by DC Comics.

Rhea Jones was the daughter of an Air Force official. After tagging along with her father to a government base in the Arctic, an explosion involving a powerful radioactive electromagnet killed her father and granted her electromagnetic abilities. Rather than stick around and be dissected and experimented on by the army, she ran away and joined the circus. After a few years, Rhea was recruited by Arani Caulder to join her new Doom Patrol.

After being recruited by Arani Caulder, aka Celsius, Rhea was now one of three new recruits into the Doom Patrol, along with Scott Fischer and Wayne Hawkins aka Karma. Celsius gave her the codename Lodestone. Her demonstrated abilities allowed her to fly, give herself Earth reinforced superstrength, create limited force fields, and attract or repel metallic objects like bullets.

Following the Invasion! storyline, Rhea and Scott were struck by a disease created by the Dominators. Her powers went wild, and then she lapsed into a coma, but ultimately she lived while Scott died.

At the start of Grant Morrison's surrealistic run of the Doom Patrol, Rhea was put into a coma that would last until halfway into the series. While in the hospital, she was kidnapped by the butterfly collector known as Red Jack, who claimed to be God, Jack the Ripper, and many others. He sought to make Rhea his bride. The new Doom Patrol followed Jack into his house, which our world is a room in. As he battled the Doom Patrol, Rhea awoke from her coma and stabbed Jack in the back, then immediately became comatose again.

Brought back to the Doom Patrol's new mountainside headquarters, Niles Caulder, the Chief, did experiments on Rhea showing that her coma wasn't normal. She was instead going through a form of metamorphosis, and her human form is the chrysalis.

Rhea awoke from her coma in issue #36 during "The Orthodoxy/Geomancer War". It was revealed that she was The Pupa, a weapon sought by the aliens Orthodoxy and Geomancers. Rhea's original body shattered, and out emerged a magnetic butterfly, explaining why she was sought out by Red Jack. After awaking, her facial features disappeared and her eyes were now on her chest and back. Her ears had also become two twinkling lights. She no longer wears clothes and seems to think nothing of it.

Rhea was actually what some call a Lodestone, a being in tune with the Earth's electromagnetic waves, its nerve system. They are the Earth's expression in flesh. The Ultraquist Geomancers kidnapped Rhea, and Rebis in the process, before she was able to fully bond with the Earth.

After ending the conflict between the Orthodoxy and the Geomancers (with help from Rebis and Robotman), Rhea pointed out a bright star in the sky, and left to go visit it. Promising to visit, she has not been seen since. Her only subsequent appearance to date has a brief flashback to her early days with Arani Desai and Valentina Vostok when the two returned during Blackest Night.

Rhea Jones in other media
 Rhea Jones makes a cameo appearance in the Batman: The Brave and the Bold episode "The Last Patrol!" as part of a poster advertising a carnival's freak show.
 Rhea Jones / Lodestone appears in the Doom Patrol episode "Doom Patrol Patrol", portrayed by Lesa Wilson as a young woman and an uncredited actress as an old woman. This version was a member of a 1950s incarnation of the Doom Patrol before they were defeated by Mr. Nobody and disbanded. As most of the team were left mentally ill following the battle, Joshua Clay became their caretaker.

Tao Jones
Tao Jones is a fictional character appearing in American comic books published by DC Comics.

She was among the children that were experimented on by Doctor Love while they were still in their mother's womb where she developed forcefield abilities. She becomes a member of Helix where they fought Infinity, Inc. on occasion.

Tao Jones in other media
Tao Jones appears in the Stargirl episode "Frenemies – Chapter Eight: Infinity Inc. Part Two", portrayed by Andi Ju. She appears as a patient at the Helix Institute for Youth Rehabilitation and is shown to share a room with Kritter.

Jumpa
Jumpa is a fictional character appearing in American comic books published by DC Comics.

On Earth-Two, Jumpa is a Kanga who was Wonder Woman's favorite Kanga and serves as her mode of transportation on Themyscira.

In 2016, DC Comics implemented another relaunch of its books called "DC Rebirth" which restored its continuity to a form much as it was prior to "The New 52". During the "Infinity War" storyline, a flashback to Wonder Woman's childhood had Wonder Woman working to train Jumpa while riding through Themyscira. Jumpa threw Diana into the ocean where the Megalodons that protect the ocean nearly attacked her. Hippolyta saved Diana and advised her to train Jumpa better.

Jumpa in other media
 Jumpa appears in the Teen Titans Go! episode "Justice League's Next Top Talent Idol Star: Justice League Edition".
 Jumpa appears in the DC Super Hero Girls episode "#GoneToTheDogs" Pt. 2.

Judge
The Judge is an alias used by different fictional characters appearing in American comic books published by DC Comics. Each iteration is usually depicted as a cloaked figure sporting a courtroom robe and a blindfold or sunglasses as well as wielding a mallet-sized gavel while opposing superheroes, such as Batman and the Flash.

Judge Clay
Judge Clay was created by Archie Goodwin and Howard Chaykin, and first appeared in Detective Comics #441 (July 1974). He was a corrupt judge in Gotham City who has a scar on his right hand and the father of Melissa Clay. He had dealings with the criminal Snow who blinded Melissa. The Judge blamed Batman for his problems despite Melissa's protests, kidnapping the original Robin as bait in using various trap-based weapons in an abandoned summer resort. The Judge is defeated by the Dynamic Duo and turned himself in when his weapons accidentally killed his own daughter.

Solomon Wayne
Solomon Zebediah Wayne was created by Dennis O'Neil and Chris Sprouse, and first appeared in Batman: Legends of the Dark Knight #27 (February 1992). He was an ancestor of Bruce Wayne and Damien Wayne, and the brother of Joshua Wayne. In the 17th century Gotham City, the Judge had a bible and a reputation for being particularly strict on crime as well as being an entrepreneur who funded the architect Cyrus Pinkney's visionary genius, ran a section of the Underground Railroad with Joshua which helped many slaves escape to freedom (but at the cost of his brother's life), and his legacy inspired Tim Drake as Red Robin.

Jacob de Witt
Jacob de Witt was created by Sam Humphries and Bernard Chang, and first appeared in Nightwing (vol. 4) #35 (February 2018). He was originally a judge from the 17th century that was tied up and drowned which made him into a blind immortal with the ability to see corruption in people's hearts. In the present, the Judge is a serial killer with a beard and a white suit who uses a casino chip calling card in Blüdhaven while having confrontations with Dick Grayson as both Robin and Nightwing before being defeated and held in a secret prison.

Hunter Zolomon

Hunter Zolomon is known as the Judge in the 25th Century Central City to oppose Barry Allen and Wally West.

Judge in other media
 A variation of the Judge appears in The New Batman Adventures episode "Judgment Day", voiced by Malachi Throne. This version is an alternate personality of Harvey Dent who acts as a violent court-themed vigilante in Gotham. The Judge uses extreme measures to apprehend the Penguin, Killer Croc, the Riddler and Two-Face before being defeated by Batman.

References

 DC Comics characters: J, List of